Persoonia conjuncta is a species of flowering plant in the family Lamiaceae and is endemic to eastern New South Wales. It is an erect shrub or small tree with narrow elliptic to lance-shaped leaves, yellow, tube-shaped flowers in groups of up to sixteen and green fruit.

Description
Flowering occurs from January to February and the fruit is a green drupe.

Taxonomy
Persoonia conjuncta was first formally described in 1991 by Lawrie Johnson and Peter Weston in the journal Telopea from specimens collected by Johnson on Mount Yarrahapinni (near Kempsey) in 1980.

Distribution and habitat
This geebung grows in forest on the coastal ranges in the Coffs Harbour district and south to the Manning River in eastern New South Wales.

References

conjuncta
Flora of New South Wales
Plants described in 1991
Taxa named by Lawrence Alexander Sidney Johnson
Taxa named by Peter H. Weston